Pizza quattro stagioni (four seasons pizza) is a variety of pizza in Italian cuisine that is prepared in four sections with diverse ingredients, with each section representing one season of the year. Artichokes represent spring, tomatoes or basil represent summer, mushrooms represent autumn and the ham, prosciutto or olives represent winter. It is a very popular pizza in Italy, and has been described as a "classic", "famous" and "renowned" Italian pizza. It is a variant of pizza capricciosa.

Preparation
It is typically prepared using a tomato sauce and cheese. Pizza quattro stagioni is most often made by adding artichokes, tomatoes or basil, mushrooms, and ham, prosciutto or olives to four separate sections of the pizza. Other ingredients may also be used. Fresh-cooked or canned artichoke hearts may be used.

Some of the topping ingredients can be partially oven-dried  so they do not make the pizza soggy. Baking it on a pizza stone can also prevent sogginess. It may be finished with olive oil drizzled atop the pizza. The pizza can be sliced into wedges or into its four sections. Pizza quattro stagioni can be vegetarian if ham is substituted by a vegetarian option.

See also
 List of Italian dishes
 List of pizza varieties by country

References

External links
 

quattro stagioni